The Jungle Book is a 1967 American animated musical comedy film produced by Walt Disney Productions. Based on Rudyard Kipling's 1894 book of the same title, it is the 19th Disney animated feature film. Directed by Wolfgang Reitherman, it is the final Disney animated film to be produced by Walt Disney, who died during its production, and the first Disney animated film to be released after his death. The plot follows Mowgli, a feral child raised in the Indian jungle by wolves, as his friends Bagheera the panther and Baloo the bear try to convince him to leave the jungle before the evil tiger Shere Khan arrives.

The early versions of both the screenplay and the soundtrack followed Kipling's work more closely, with a dramatic, dark, and sinister tone which Disney did not want in his family film, leading to writer Bill Peet and songwriter Terry Gilkyson being replaced. The casting employed famous actors and musicians Phil Harris, Sebastian Cabot, George Sanders and Louis Prima, as well as Disney regulars such as Sterling Holloway, J. Pat O'Malley and Verna Felton, and the director's son, Bruce Reitherman, as Mowgli.

The Jungle Book was released on October 18, 1967, to positive reception, with acclaim for its soundtrack, featuring five songs by the Sherman Brothers and one by Gilkyson, "The Bare Necessities". With a gross of $23.8 million worldwide, the film initially became Disney's second-highest-grossing animated film in the United States and Canada, the ninth-highest-grossing film of 1967, and was also successful during its re-releases. The film was also successful throughout the world, becoming Germany's highest-grossing film by number of admissions. Disney released a live-action adaptation in 1994 and an animated sequel, The Jungle Book 2, in 2003; a live-action/CGI hybrid remake directed by Jon Favreau was released in 2016, with a sequel to that film in development.

Plot

Mowgli, a young orphan boy, is found in a basket in the deep jungles of India by Bagheera, a black panther who promptly takes him to Raksha, a mother wolf who has just had cubs. She and her mate, Rama, raise him along with their own cubs and after ten years, Mowgli becomes well acquainted with jungle life and plays with his wolf siblings. Bagheera is pleased with how happy Mowgli is now, but also worries that Mowgli must eventually return to his own kind.

One night, the wolf pack parents meet at Council Rock, having learned that Shere Khan, a Bengal tiger, has returned to the pack's part of the jungle. Pack leader Akela decides that Mowgli must leave the jungle for his own safety, and the safety of those around him, due to the tiger’s intense hatred of humans due to a fear of guns and fire. Bagheera volunteers to escort him to a "Man-Village". They leave that very night, but Mowgli is determined to stay in the jungle. He and Bagheera rest in a tree for the night, where Kaa, a hungry Indian python, tries to devour Mowgli by hypnotising Mowgli into a deep sleep, but Bagheera intervenes. The next morning, Mowgli tries to join the elephant patrol, led by Colonel Hathi and his wife Winifred. Bagheera finds Mowgli, but after a fight, decides to leave Mowgli on his own. Mowgli soon meets up with the laid-back, fun-loving sloth bear Baloo, who promises to raise Mowgli himself and never take him to the Man-Village.

Shortly afterward, a group of monkeys kidnap Mowgli and take him to their leader, King Louie the orangutan. King Louie offers to help Mowgli stay in the jungle if he will tell Louie how to make fire, like other humans. However, since he was not raised by humans, Mowgli does not know how to make fire. Bagheera and Baloo arrive to rescue Mowgli and in the ensuing chaos, King Louie's palace is demolished to rubble. Bagheera speaks to Baloo that night and convinces him that the jungle will never be safe for Mowgli with Shere Khan around. In the morning, Baloo reluctantly explains to Mowgli that the Man-Village is best for him, but Mowgli accuses him of breaking his promise and runs away. As Baloo sets off in search of Mowgli, Bagheera rallies the help of Hathi and his patrol. However, Shere Khan, who was eavesdropping on Bagheera and Hathi's conversation, is now determined to hunt and kill Mowgli.

Meanwhile, Mowgli has a second encounter with Kaa, who once again, attempts to eat him after putting him to sleep with hypnosis, but eventually wakes up and escapes thanks to the unwitting intervention of the suspicious Shere Khan. As a storm gathers in a desolate area of the jungle, a depressed Mowgli encounters a group of friendly vultures who accept Mowgli as a fellow outcast. Shere Khan appears shortly after, scaring off the vultures and confronting Mowgli. Baloo arrives and haplessly tries to keep the tiger from getting the boy, getting knocked unconscious in the process. When lightning strikes a nearby tree and sets it ablaze, the vultures swoop in to distract Shere Khan, while Mowgli grabs a large flaming branch and ties it to the tiger's tail. Shere Khan, seeing this, panics and runs away.

Afterward, Bagheera and Baloo take Mowgli to the edge of the Man-Village, but Mowgli is still hesitant to go there. However, his mind abruptly changes when he is smitten by a beautiful young girl from the village who is coming down by the riverside to fetch water. After noticing Mowgli, she "accidentally" drops her water pot. Mowgli retrieves it for her and follows her into the Man-Village. After Mowgli shrugs to Baloo and Bagheera, to show that he has made up his mind and chosen to go to the Man-Village, Baloo and Bagheera decide to head home, content that Mowgli is safe and happy with his own kind.

Voice cast

 Bruce Reitherman as Mowgli, an orphaned boy, commonly referred to as "man-cub" by the other characters
 Phil Harris as Baloo, a sloth bear who leads a carefree life and believes in letting the good things in life come by themselves
 Sebastian Cabot as Bagheera, a black panther who is determined to take Mowgli back to the village and disapproves of Baloo's carefree approach to life
 Louis Prima as King Louie, an orangutan  who wants to be a human, and wants Mowgli to teach him how to make fire
 George Sanders as Shere Khan, an intelligent yet merciless Bengal tiger who hates all humans for fear of their guns and fire and wants to kill Mowgli
 Sterling Holloway as Kaa, an Indian python who also seeks Mowgli as prey, but comically fails each time he attempts to eat him
 J. Pat O'Malley as Colonel Hathi the Indian elephant / Buzzy the Vulture
 Verna Felton as Winifred, Colonel Hathi's wife
 Clint Howard as Junior, Colonel Hathi's son
 Chad Stuart as Flaps the Vulture
 Lord Tim Hudson as Dizzy the Vulture
 John Abbott as Akela the Indian wolf
 Ben Wright as Rama the Father Wolf
 Darleen Carr as the human girl 
 Leo De Lyon as Flunkey the Langur*
 Hal Smith as The Slob Elephant*
 Ralph Wright as The Gloomy Elephant*
 Digby Wolfe as Ziggy the Vulture*
 Bill Skiles and Pete Henderson as Monkeys*

Asterisks mark actors listed in the opening credits as "Additional Voices".

Production

Development and writing

Before The Sword in the Stone was released, story artist Bill Peet claimed to Walt Disney that "we [the animation department] can do more interesting animal characters" and suggested that Rudyard Kipling's The Jungle Book could be used for the studio's next film. Disney agreed and acquired the film rights from the estate of Alexander Korda (who had produced the 1942 film adaptation) by April 1962, after having spent the previous ten years in negotiations. 

Peet created an original treatment, with little supervision, as he had done with One Hundred and One Dalmatians and The Sword in the Stone. Peet decided to follow closely the dramatic, dark, and sinister tone of Kipling's book, which is about the struggles between animals and man. However, he also decided to make the story more straightforward, as the novel is very episodic, with Mowgli going back and forth from the jungle to the Man-Village, and Peet felt that Mowgli returning to the Man-Village should be the ending for the film. Following suggestions, Peet also created the character of Louie, king of the monkeys. Louie was a less comical character, enslaving Mowgli trying to get the boy to teach him to make fire. The orangutan would also show a plot point borrowed from The Second Jungle Book, gold and jewels under his ruins.<ref name=kipling>{{cite AV media|title=Disney's Kipling: Walt's Magic Touch on a Literary Classic|location=The Jungle Book Platinum Edition, Disc 2|publisher=Walt Disney Home Entertainment|year=2007}}</ref> The ending also was very different from the final film's. After Mowgli had arrived to the man village, he would get into an argument with Buldeo the hunter which would cause him to return to the jungle with a torch that he would use to scare those who attacked or mocked him through the journey, before being dragged back to the ruins by Buldeo in search for the treasure. After recovering a great part of the treasure, Buldeo would declare his intentions to burn the jungle to avoid the threat of Shere Khan, only for the tiger to attack and kill him, before being killed by Mowgli with the hunter's gun. Due to his actions, Mowgli would be hailed as a hero in both the jungle and the village, and declared the first human to be part of the wolves' council.

After the disappointing reaction to The Sword in the Stone, Walt Disney decided to become more involved in the story than he had been with the past two films, with his nephew Roy E. Disney saying that "[he] certainly influenced everything about it. (...) With Jungle Book, he obviously got hooked on the jungle and the characters that lived there". Disney was not pleased with how the story was turning out, as he felt it was too dark for family viewing and insisted on script changes. Peet refused, and after a long argument, Peet left the Disney studio in January 1964.

Disney then assigned Larry Clemmons as his new writer and one of the four-story men for the film, giving Clemmons a copy of Kipling's book, and telling him: "The first thing I want you to do is not to read it". Clemmons still looked at the novel and thought it was too disjointed and without continuity, needing adaptations to fit a film script. Clemmons wanted to start in medias res, with some flashbacks afterward, but then Disney said to focus on doing the storyline more straight: "Let's do the meat of the picture. Let's establish the characters. Let's have fun with it".

Although most of Peet's work was discarded, the personalities of the characters remained in the final film. This was because Disney felt that the story should be kept simple, and the characters should drive the story. Disney took an active role in the story meetings, acting out each role and helping to explore the emotions of the characters, helping create gags, and developing emotional sequences. Clemmons also created the human girl with whom Mowgli falls in love, as the animators considered that falling in love would be the best excuse for Mowgli to leave the jungle. Clemmons would write a rough script with an outline for most sequences. The story artists then discussed how to fill the scenes, including the comedic gags to employ. The script also tried to incorporate how the voice actors molded their characters and interacted with each other. The Jungle Book also marked the last animated film to have Disney's personal touches, before his death on December 15, 1966.

Casting

Many familiar voices had inspired the animators in their creation of the characters and helped them shape their personalities. This use of familiar voices for key characters was a rarity in Disney's past films. During the casting process, Disney suggested Phil Harris as Baloo after meeting him at a party. In response, the animation staff was shocked to hear that a wise cracking comedian such as Harris was going to be in a Kipling film. At his first recording session, Harris improvized most of his lines, as he considered the scripted lines "didn't feel natural". 

The Sherman Brothers re-imagined Peet's darker more sinister version of King Louie as a more comedic character based around jazz and swing music. As Richard M. Sherman recalled: "...our discussion at the time [was], 'He's an ape, what does an ape do? Swings in a tree. The jazz is swing music and a guy literally swings if he's an ape.'" Initially, Louis Armstrong was considered for the role: "We thought it would be great for him..." Richard Sherman said, "...But one of the writers said 'you know the NAACP is going to jump all over it having a black man playing an ape – it would be politically terrible.' That was the last thing on our minds, nothing we'd ever thought of, so we said 'okay, we'll think of someone else.'" After Phil Harris was cast as Baloo, Disneyland Records president Jimmy Johnson suggested Disney to get Louis Prima as King Louie, as he "felt that Louis would be great as foil" for Harris' Baloo.

Disney also cast other prominent actors such as George Sanders as Shere Khan and Sebastian Cabot as Bagheera. Additionally, he cast regular Disney voices such as Sterling Holloway as Kaa, J. Pat O'Malley as Colonel Hathi and Buzzie the Vulture, and Verna Felton as Hathi's wife. This was Felton's last film before her death. David Bailey was originally cast as Mowgli, but his voice changed during production, leading Bailey to not fit the "young innocence of Mowgli's character" at which the producers were aiming. As a result, director Wolfgang Reitherman cast his son Bruce, who had just voiced Christopher Robin in Winnie the Pooh and the Honey Tree. The animators shot footage of Bruce as a guide for the character's performance. Child actress Darlene Carr was going around singing in the studio when composers Sherman Brothers asked her to record a demo of "My Own Home". Carr's performance impressed Disney enough for him to cast her as the role of the human girl.

In the original book, the vultures are grim and evil characters who feast on the dead. Disney lightened it up by having the vultures bearing a physical and vocal resemblance to The Beatles, including the signature mop-top haircut. It was also planned to have the members of the band to both voice the characters and sing their song, "That's What Friends Are For". However, at the time, The Beatles' John Lennon refused to work on animated films which led to the idea being discarded. The casting of the vultures still brought a British Invasion musician, Chad Stuart of the duo Chad & Jeremy. In earlier drafts of the scene the vultures had a near-sighted rhinoceros friend named Rocky, who was to be voiced by Frank Fontaine. However, Disney decided to cut the character, feeling that the film already had enough action with the monkeys and vultures.

Animation
Animation on The Jungle Book commenced on June 1, 1965. While many of the later Disney feature films had animators being responsible for single characters, in The Jungle Book the animators were in charge of whole sequences, since many have characters interacting with one another. The animation was done by xerography, with character design, led by Ken Anderson, employing rough, artistic edges in contrast to the round animals seen in productions such as Dumbo.

Anderson also decided to make Shere Khan resemble his voice actor, George Sanders. Backgrounds were hand-painted—with an exception of the waterfall, mostly consisting of footage of the Angel Falls—and sometimes scenery was used in both foreground and bottom to create a notion of depth. One of Reitherman's trademarks was repurposing animation from previous animated films, including his. For example, animation of the wolf cubs were redrawn from the dalmatian puppies in One Hundred and One Dalmatians. Animator Milt Kahl based Bagheera and Shere Khan's movements on live-action felines, which he saw in two Disney productions, A Tiger Walks and the True-Life Adventure film Jungle Cat.

Baloo was also based on footage of bears, even incorporating the animal's penchant for scratching. Since Kaa has no limbs, his design received big expressive eyes, and parts of Kaa's body did the action that normally would be done with hands. The monkeys' dance during "I Wan'na Be Like You" was partially inspired by a performance Louis Prima did with his band on a Las Vegas soundstage that convinced Disney to cast him.

Music

The film's score was composed by George Bruns and orchestrated by Walter Sheets. Two of the cues were reused from previous Disney films: the scene where Mowgli wakes up after escaping King Louie used one of Bruns' themes for Sleeping Beauty; and the scene where Bagheera gives a eulogy to Baloo when he mistakenly thinks the bear was killed by Shere Khan used Paul J. Smith's organ score from Snow White and the Seven Dwarfs.

The score features eight original songs: seven by the Sherman Brothers and one by Terry Gilkyson. Longtime Disney collaborator Gilkyson was the first songwriter to bring several complete songs that followed the book closely but Walt Disney felt that his efforts were too dark. The only piece of Gilkyson's work which survived to the final film was his upbeat tune "The Bare Necessities", which was liked by the rest of the film crew. The Sherman Brothers were then brought in to do a complete rewrite. Disney asked the siblings if they had read Kipling's book and they replied that they had done so "a long, long time ago" and that they had also seen the 1942 version by Alexander Korda. Disney said the "nice, mysterious, heavy stuff" from both works was not what he aimed for, instead going for a "lightness, a Disney touch". Disney frequently brought the composers to the storyline sessions. He asked them to "find scary places and write fun songs" for their compositions that fit in with the story and advanced the plot instead of being interruptive.

Release and reception
Original theatrical runThe Jungle Book was released in October 1967, just 10 months after Walt Disney's death. Some bookings were in a double feature format with Charlie, the Lonesome Cougar. Produced on a budget of $4 million, the film was a massive success, grossing domestic rentals of $11.5 million by 1968. By 1970, the film had grossed $13 million in domestic rentals, becoming the second highest-grossing animated film in the United States and Canada. The film earned over $23.8 million worldwide becoming the most successful animated film released during its initial run.

Re-releasesThe Jungle Book was re-released theatrically in North America in 1978, 1984, and 1990, and also in Europe throughout the 1970s and 1980s. A re-issue in the United Kingdom in 1976 generated rentals of $1.8 million. The 1978 re-release increased its North American rentals to $27.3 million, which surpassed Snow White and the Seven Dwarfs making it the highest grossing animated film in the United States and Canada until Snow White was re-released in 1983. The film's total lifetime gross in the U.S. and Canada is $141 million. When adjusted for inflation, it is estimated to be equivalent to $671,224,000 in 2018, which would make it the 32nd highest-grossing film in the United States and Canada.The Jungle Book is Germany's biggest film in terms of admissions with 27.3 million tickets sold, nearly 10 million more than Titanics 18.8 million tickets sold. It has grossed an estimated $108 million in Germany, making it the third highest-grossing film in that country behind only Avatar ($137 million) and Titanic ($125 million). The film was the seventh most popular sound film of the twentieth century in the UK with admissions of 19.8 million. The film is France's ninth biggest film in terms of admissions with 14.8 million tickets sold. The film's 1993 re-release set an overseas record for a re-issue, grossing  overseas during that year. It opened at number one in Germany with a gross of more than $4 million in its first six days and opened in second place at the UK box office before moving to number one for two weeks.

Home mediaThe Jungle Book was released in the United States on VHS in 1991 as part of the Walt Disney Classics video line and in the United Kingdom in 1993. In the United States, the VHS release sold 7.4million units and grossed  in 1991, making it the year's third best-selling home video release, behind only Fantasia and Home Alone. By 1994, The Jungle Book sold 9.5million units in the United States. Home video sales outside North America reached a record 14million units and grossed  by December 1993. Overseas sales reached 14.8 million units by January 1994, becoming the bestselling international VHS release in overseas markets, including sales of 4.9million units in the United Kingdom, 4.3million in Germany, and 1.2million in France. By August 1994, it had sold 15million units in international overseas markets, bringing worldwide sales to million units by 1994. As of 2002, The Jungle Book held the record for the bestselling home video release in the United Kingdom, ahead of Titanic which sold 4.8million units.

It was reissued on video in 1997 as part of the Walt Disney Masterpiece Collection for the film's 30th anniversary. A Limited Issue DVD was released by Buena Vista Home Entertainment in 1999. The film was released once again as a 2-disc Platinum Edition DVD on October 2, 2007 to commemorate its 40th anniversary. Its release was accompanied by a limited 18-day run at Disney's own El Capitan Theatre in Los Angeles, with the opening night featuring a panel with composer Richard Sherman and voice actors Bruce Reitherman, Darlene Carr, and Chad Stuart. The Platinum DVD was put on moratorium in 2010. The film was released in a Blu-ray/DVD/Digital Copy Combo pack on February 11, 2014 as part of Disney's Diamond Edition line. The Diamond Edition release went back into the Disney Vault on January 31, 2017. In the United States, the DVD and Blu-ray releases sold 12 million units between 2007 and 2016, and have grossed  as of August 2018. A Limited Edition from Disney Movie Club was released on Blu-ray and DVD combo on March 26, 2019.  The film was re-released on Blu-ray/DVD/Digital on February 22, 2022 in honor of the film's 55th anniversary.

Critical receptionThe Jungle Book received positive reviews upon release, undoubtedly influenced by a nostalgic reaction to the death of Walt Disney. Time magazine noted the film strayed far from the Kipling stories, but "[n]evertheless, the result is thoroughly delightful...it is the happiest possible way to remember Walt Disney". Howard Thompson of The New York Times praised the film as "simple, uncluttered, straight-forward fun, as put together by the director, Wolfgang Reitherman, four screen writers and the usual small army of technicians. Using some lovely exotic pastel backgrounds and a nice clutch of tunes, the picture unfolds like an intelligent comic-strip fairy tale". Richard Schickel, reviewing for Life magazine, referred to it as "the best thing of its kind since Dumbo, another short, bright, unscary and blessedly uncultivated cartoon". Charles Champlin of the Los Angeles Times wrote the film was "really, really good Disney indeed, and nobody needs to say a great deal more." Arthur D. Murphy of Variety gave the film a favorable review while noting that "the story development is restrained" and that younger audiences "may squirm at times". The song "The Bare Necessities" was nominated for Best Original Song at the 40th Academy Awards, losing to "Talk to the Animals" from Doctor Dolittle. Academy of Motion Picture Arts and Sciences president Gregory Peck lobbied extensively for the film to be nominated for Best Picture, but was unsuccessful.

Retrospective reviews were also positive, with the film's animation, characters and music receiving much praise throughout the years. The site's critical consensus reads: "With expressive animation, fun characters, and catchy songs, The Jungle Book endures as a crowd-pleasing Disney classic." In 1990, when the film had its last theatrical re-release, Ken Tucker of Entertainment Weekly considered that The Jungle Book "isn't a classic Walt Disney film on the order of, say, Cinderella or Pinocchio, but it's one of Disney's liveliest and funniest". Charles Solomon, reviewing for the Los Angeles Times, thought the film's animators was "near the height of their talents" and the resulting film "remains a high-spirited romp that will delight children—and parents weary of action films with body counts that exceed their box-office grosses". In 2010, Empire described the film as one that "gets pretty much everything right", noting that the vibrant animation and catchy songs overcame the plot deficiencies.

Colin Greenland reviewed The Jungle Book for Imagine magazine, and stated that "the last film the old boy worked on himself and I reckon the last good animated feature in his traditional mode - not least because of some rather jolly jazz which, legend has it, Walt himself resisted, and was added after his death."

Controversy
There has been criticism of the portrayal of King Louie, who some have viewed as a racist caricature of African Americans. However,  this was not the filmmakers' intention as the character and mannerisms of King Louie were largely based on his voice actor, Louis Prima, a well-known Italian American jazz musician and performer, who would have been instantly recognizable to audiences during the late 1960s. While Louis Armstrong was briefly considered for the part, the filmmakers quickly steered away from that direction upon realizing the racist implications.

In 2019, Disney added disclaimers warning of "outdated cultural depictions" at the start of the film on Disney+. In January 2021, Disney removed access to the film for child profiles in Disney+, and strengthened the warning message to read: "This program includes negative depictions and/or mistreatment of people or cultures. These stereotypes were wrong then and are wrong now. Rather than remove this content, we want to acknowledge its harmful impact, learn from it and spark conversation to create a more inclusive future together."

Legacy
In 1968, Disneyland Records released the album More Jungle Book, an unofficial sequel also written by screenwriter Larry Simmons, which continued the story of the film, and included Phil Harris and Louis Prima voicing their film roles. In the record, Baloo (Harris) is missing Mowgli (Ginny Tyler), so he teams up with King Louie (Prima) and Bagheera (Dal McKennon) to take him from the man village. On February 14, 2003, DisneyToon Studios in Australia released a film sequel, The Jungle Book 2, in which Mowgli runs away from the man village to see his animal friends, unaware that Shere Khan is more determined to kill him than ever. In 2005, screenwriter Robert Reece pitched Jungle Book 3 to Disney execs., but the project never materialized.

Elements of The Jungle Book were recycled in the later Disney feature film Robin Hood, such as Baloo being inspiration for Little John (who not only was a bear, but also voiced by Phil Harris). In particular, the dance sequence between Baloo and King Louie was simply rotoscoped for Little John and Lady Cluck's dance. It has been widely acclaimed by animators, with Eric Goldberg declaring The Jungle Book "boasts possibly the best character animation a studio has ever done". The animators of Aladdin, The Lion King, Tarzan, and Lilo & Stitch took inspiration from the design and animation of the film, and four people involved with Disney's animations, director Brad Bird and animators Andreas Deja, Glen Keane and Sergio Pablos, have declared the film to be their inspiration for entering the business.

In 1978, a live-action sketch titled The Wonderful World of Ernie from Morecambe and Wise parodied I Wan'na Be Like You (The Monkey Song) by doing a full reenactment of the scene with sets and costumes and lip-synching to the song's original recording (including the characters' spoken dialogue in the middle of the song).  The sketch starred Danny Rolnick as Mowgli, Derek Griffiths as Bagheera, Eric Morecambe as Baloo and Ernie Wise as King Louie.

Many characters appear in the 1990–91 animated series TaleSpin. Between 1996 and 1998, the TV series Jungle Cubs told the stories of Baloo, Hahti, Bagheera, Louie, Kaa, and Shere Khan when they were children. Disney later made a live-action adaptation of the film, which was more of a realistic action-adventure film with somewhat-more adult themes. The film, released in 1994, differs even more from the book than its animated counterpart, but was still a box-office success. In 1998, Disney released a direct to video film entitled The Jungle Book: Mowgli's Story. A new live-action version of The Jungle Book was released by Disney in 2016, which even reused most of the songs of the animated movie, with some lyrical reworking by original composer Richard M. Sherman.

There are two video games based on the film: The Jungle Book was a platformer released in 1993 for Master System, Mega Drive, Game Gear, Super NES, Game Boy and PC. A version for the Game Boy Advance was later released in 2003. The Jungle Book Groove Party was a dance mat game released in 2000 for PlayStation and PlayStation 2. Kaa and Shere Khan have also made cameo appearances in another Disney video game, QuackShot. A world based on the film was intended to appear more than once in the Square Enix-Disney Kingdom Hearts video game series, but was omitted both times, first in the first game because it featured a similar world based on Tarzan, and second in Kingdom Hearts: Birth by Sleep, although areas of the world are accessible via hacking codes. Baloo and Mowgli appear as interactive characters in Adventureland on Kinect: Disneyland Adventures released in 2011 and re-released in 2017. Mowgli, Bagheera, Baloo, Shere Khan and King Louie appear as playable characters in the video game Disney Magic Kingdoms. Baloo appears as a playable character on Disney Mirrorverse released in 2022. Baloo and Mowgli appear as a playable characters on the kart racing game Disney Speedstorm released in 2022. Since the film's release, many of the film's characters appeared in House of Mouse, The Lion King 1½, Who Framed Roger Rabbit, and Aladdin and the King of Thieves. In December 2010, a piece of artwork by British artist Banksy featuring The Jungle Book characters which had been commissioned by Greenpeace to help raise awareness of deforestation went on sale for the sum of £80,000.

Exhibition
A behind-the-scenes exhibition titled Walt Disney’s The Jungle Book: Making a Masterpiece, guest-curated by Andreas Deja took place at The Walt Disney Family Museum from June 23, 2022 to January 8, 2023. The event celebrated the film’s 55th anniversary by displaying over 600 pieces of rare artwork, manuscripts, photos, animation drawings and cels as well as ephemera.  It also detailed the entire story of the film’s production, its release and the worldwide recognition it has earned through the years. A Members Only Preview which included a special talk with Andreas Deja, Bruce Reitherman, Darleen Carr and Floyd Norman took place on June 22, 2022. An extensive companion book, Walt Disney's The Jungle Book: Making a Masterpiece also written by Deja was originally slated to be published by Weldon Owen on September 20, 2022, before it was changed to November 1, 2022.

Special screenings of the film took place at the museum's theater from July 2 to July 31, 2022.

See also
 1967 in film
 List of American films of 1967
 List of animated feature films of the 1960s
 List of highest-grossing films
 List of highest-grossing animated films
 List of highest-grossing films in France
 List of Walt Disney Pictures films
 List of Disney theatrical animated features

Notes

 
  In 2003, Variety listed the worldwide gross for The Jungle Book'' at $378 million. It also listed the North American gross at $128 million, which is lower than the reported estimate at $141 million.

References

External links

 
 
 
 
 
 

1967 animated films
1967 films
1960s fantasy adventure films
1960s American animated films
1960s fantasy comedy films
1967 musical comedy films
American children's animated adventure films
American children's animated fantasy films
American children's animated musical films
American fantasy adventure films
American fantasy comedy films
American musical comedy films
American animated feature films
Animated buddy films
Animated films about apes
Animated films about orphans
Animated films based on children's books
The Jungle Book (franchise)
1960s English-language films
Animated films about bears
Animated films about elephants
Animated films about animals
Films about royalty
Animated films about snakes
Animated films about tigers
Films adapted into television shows
Films adapted into comics
Films directed by Wolfgang Reitherman
Films produced by Walt Disney
Films scored by George Bruns
Films set in jungles
Films set in palaces
Films set in India
The Jungle Book films
Musicals by the Sherman Brothers
Walt Disney Animation Studios films
Walt Disney Pictures animated films
Animated films about birds
Animated films about friendship
1960s children's adventure films
1960s children's animated films
Animated films about monkeys